Abdelsalam Atalla al-Majali (18 February 1925 – 3 January 2023) was a Jordanian physician and politician who served twice as Prime Minister of Jordan.

Early life and education
Majali was born in Al-Karak, Emirate of Transjordan, on 18 February 1925. He received his medical degree from Syrian University in Damascus in 1949. He also held a diploma of Laryngology and Otology from the Royal College of Physicians in London, which he obtained in 1953. He was awarded a fellowship by the American College of Surgeons in 1960. In 1974, he received the degree of Doctor Honoris Causa from Hacettepe University.

Career
Majali was director of medical services for the Jordanian Armed Forces from 1960 to 1969. He also served as minister of health (1969–1971), minister of state for prime ministerial affairs (1970–1971 and 1976–1979) and also, minister of education (1976–1979). He was then named as president of the University of Jordan (1971–1976 and 1980–1989). In 1973, Majali was promoted to be a professor of medicine at the University of Jordan. He served as advisor to King Hussein starting in the late 1980s.

Majali was prime minister from May 1993 to January 1995, during which time he signed the 1994 Israel–Jordan peace treaty. When he was appointed prime minister, he was also given the portfolio of foreign minister. On 5 January 1995, he resigned from office. He again was prime minister from 1997 to 1998, after which he was appointed to the Jordanian senate.

In January 2003 Majali was named as a member of the committee of patrons of the Anglo-Arab Organisation. As of 2013, Majali was chairman of the Islamic World Academy of Sciences.

Personal life and death
Majali died on 3 January 2023, at the age of 97.

See also
 Hazza' al-Majali

References

External links
Profile of Abdelsalam al-Majali

1925 births
2023 deaths
Prime Ministers of Jordan
Members of the Senate of Jordan
Government ministers of Jordan
Defence ministers of Jordan
Foreign ministers of Jordan
Education ministers of Jordan
Prime ministry affairs ministers of Jordan
Health ministers of Jordan
Jordanian military personnel
Academic staff of the University of Jordan
Jordanian surgeons
Otolaryngologists
People from Al Karak